Alister Graham Kirby (14 April 1886 – 29 March 1917) was a British rower who competed in the 1912 Summer Olympics. He died on service during the First World War.

Kirby was born at Brompton, West London, the son of Arthur Raymond Kirby, a Bencher of Lincoln's Inn and his wife Gertrude Fleming. He was educated at Eton College and Magdalen College, Oxford. He rowed for Oxford in the Boat Race in 1906, 1907, 1908 and 1909 but was only in the winning crew in his last year 1909, when he was president. He was President of Vincent's Club in 1909. Kirby became a member of Leander Club and was captain of the Leander eight which won the gold medal for Great Britain rowing at the 1912 Summer Olympics.

On the outbreak of World War I, he was commissioned into the Rifle Brigade and served as a captain. He died from illness in 1917 aged 30 and was buried at Mazargues War Cemetery, Marseille, France.

See also
 List of Olympians killed in World War I
 List of Oxford University Boat Race crews

References

External links
 
 
 

1886 births
1917 deaths
Burials in France
Military personnel from London
People educated at Eton College
Alumni of Magdalen College, Oxford
English male rowers
British male rowers
Olympic rowers of Great Britain
Rowers at the 1912 Summer Olympics
English Olympic medallists
Olympic gold medallists for Great Britain
Rifle Brigade officers
British Army personnel of World War I
British military personnel killed in World War I
Olympic medalists in rowing
Oxford University Boat Club rowers
Members of Leander Club
Medalists at the 1912 Summer Olympics